London Fields is a London Overground station on the Lea Valley Lines, serving the district of London Fields in the London Borough of Hackney, east London. Its three-letter station code is LOF and it is in Travelcard zone 2.

History
The station dates from 1872 when it was opened by the Great Eastern Railway. It was closed from 22 May 1916 and reopened 1 July 1919 as a wartime economy measure. Electrification of the line was instituted in 1960, and London Fields station was reduced to weekday peak period-only service for much of the 1980s and 1990s. It had its services suspended altogether for five years after a fire in 1981 that seriously damaged the main station buildings, putting its future in serious doubt. Repairs were eventually carried out and the station reopened in 1986, though still on a limited basis (like the neighbouring Cambridge Heath). Both stations eventually regained a regular daytime service after a 1998 timetable change.  Evening and Saturday trains were added in 2001, and the current service level including Sunday trains commenced in 2005.

London Fields and all services that call were previously operated by Abellio Greater Anglia. However, in 2015 they were transferred to London Overground operations and the station was added to the tube map.

Services
Trains are operated by London Overground. London Overground services to Chingford pass the station on the fast lines.

References

Bibliography
Body, G. (1986), PSL Field Guides - Railways of the Eastern Region, Volume 1, Patrick Stephens Ltd, Wellingborough,

External links

Former Great Eastern Railway stations
Railway stations in the London Borough of Hackney
Railway stations in Great Britain opened in 1872
Railway stations in Great Britain closed in 1916
Railway stations in Great Britain opened in 1919
Railway stations served by London Overground
Hackney, London